Maria E. Piñeres (b. 1966) is a Colombia-born American artist who lives and works in Los Angeles, CA. Her work, mostly embroidery, has been exhibited at the Museum of Art & Design in New York City. and Scottsdale Museum of Contemporary Art. She studied painting at The Art Students League of New York and graduated  from Parsons School of Design with a BFA in illustration.

Embroidery work
Piñeres credits her mother and grandmother for teaching her to sew, knit, and crochet, but she taught herself needlepoint after discovering a book by Mary Martin, an actress and avid needlepointer. The artist's work often consists of homo-erotic imagery taken from vintage pin-up magazines combined with vivid, sometimes complex, textile pattern backgrounds.
Piñeres first became widely known through her series of needlepoint celebrity mug shots which was first exhibited in 2005. This series included portraits of celebrities such as Robert Downey Jr., Paris Hilton, and Michael Jackson, as well as a portrait of Jack White which was later shown in V magazine. Piñeres’ interest in the subject came from a desire to show the celebrity in a vulnerable moment, without the protection of stylists and agents.

Exhibitions 

In 2013, Piñeres’ solo exhibition of Playland was shown in New York, NY by DCKT Contemporary. Piñeres’ needlepoint artwork depicted nude figures with a combination of attention-grabbing graphics of pinball machine playfields.  Piñeres’ needlepoint artwork created a sexual and playful atmosphere by combining both the nude figures and pinball machines in the nonoperational Playland. As Dean Dempsey argued, that this is where Piñeres’ makes her connection – the idea that both pursuits are those fundamentally concerned with luck and chance. Piñeres exploits the kitsch status of needlepoint to make a vague statement on contemporary society.

Technique
Piñeres uses several different techniques including gathering imagery from vintage magazines, digital collages with images collected from the internet, and her own photographs. After some manipulation, the images are embroidered by fusing traditional needlework techniques ranging from a simple Continental stitch to more complex Bargello and Florentine traditions, which lend rich texture with a modern painterly focus on light and color.

References

1966 births
Living people
20th-century American women artists
21st-century American women artists
20th-century Colombian women artists
21st-century Colombian women artists
High School of Art and Design alumni
Art Students League of New York alumni
Parsons School of Design alumni
People from Medellín
American embroiderers